The 2022–23 Lietuvos krepšinio lyga, also called Betsafe-LKL for sponsorship reasons, is the 30th season of the top-tier level professional basketball league of Lithuania, the Lietuvos krepšinio lyga (LKL). Rytas are defending champions.

Teams

Location and arenas
On 20 May 2022, during 2021–22 LKL season LKL board decided to expand the number of participating teams in tournament. The number of teams has been expanded to 12 teams. 2021-22 NKL season champions Gargždai and new team Wolves will join the other 10 existing LKL teams.

Regular season

League table

Results

Statistics

Average attendances

Individual statistics

Rating

Source: LKL.LT

Points

Source: LKL.LT

Rebounds

Source: LKL.LT

Assists

Source: LKL.LT

Other statistics

Source: LKL.LT

Individual game highs

Source: LKL.LT

Team statistics

Source: LKL.LT

Awards
All official awards of the 2022-23 LKL season.

Player of the month

Lithuanian clubs in European competitions

Lithuanian clubs in Regional competitions

Sponsors

Source: LKL.LT

References

Lietuvos krepšinio lyga seasons
Basketball in Lithuania
Lith
Lith